Matlock, Manitoba is a resort community that comprises the southernmost part of the Village of Dunnottar, Manitoba, Canada, on the southwestern shore of Lake Winnipeg. Along with the adjacent communities of Whytewold and Ponemah, Matlock forms the Village of Dunnotar. Exact population figures are difficult to measure, as the community maintains a small number of year-round residents but a much larger seasonal population during the summer months.

The community was named for Matlock, Derbyshire in England.

References

Unincorporated communities in Interlake Region, Manitoba